The Du Londel Troupe was a French 18th-century theatre troupe. From 1753 to 1771, it was active as the French Theatre of Sweden, where it played a great part in that country's theatre history.

The French troupe performed in Copenhagen in Denmark in 1748–53. They also performed in Oslo in Norway during the king's stay there in 1749. The troupe was under the leadership of Jeanne Du Londel, widow of Jean Du Londel, and Pierre de Laynay in 1753, when they were invited to Sweden by the initiative of the Swedish queen, Louisa Ulrika of Prussia.

The troupe followed the royal court between the royal palaces and performed on the court- theatres, such as the Drottningholm Theatre and Confidencen, but they also performed for the public in the theatre of Bollhuset in Stockholm during the Winter. After the season of 1753-54, the Stockholm theatre was reserved for them and the Swedish actors were turned out, which interrupted the development of the Swedish language theatre; the Swedish theatre formed the Stenborg Troupe. The Du Londel Troupe performed the latest plays from Paris and also ballets, but they largely remained a pleasure for those who could speak French. In 1771, the French Theatre was dissolved by Gustav III of Sweden, who wished to establish a Swedish-language national theatre.

The Du Londel troupe is mostly remembered in history for interrupting the development of the Swedish theatre and replacing it with a theatre which was only understandable for those who could speak French; but the current view is that they made "The gracious French singing theatre" popular in Sweden, and thereby inspired to the foundation of the Royal Dramatic Theatre and the Royal Swedish Opera.

See also
 La troupe du Roi de Suede

References
 Lars Löfgren (2003). Svensk teater (Swedish theatre). Stockholm: Natur och Kultur. .
 Forser, Tomas & Heed, Sven Åke (red.), Ny svensk teaterhistoria. 1, Teater före 1800, Gidlund, Hedemora, 2007 
 Anna Ivarsdotter Johnsson and Leif Jonsson: Musiken i Sverige. Frihetstiden och Gustaviansk tid 1720-1810 (Music in Sweden. The age of liberty and the Gustavian age 17201-1810)
 Klas Ralf, Operan 200 år. Jubelboken (The Opera 200 years. The Jubilee book) Prisma
 H.J. Huitfeldt, Christiania Theaterhistorie (in Norwegian)

18th century in Sweden
18th-century theatre
French comedy troupes
Former theatres in Stockholm
1753 establishments in Sweden
1771 disestablishments in Europe
Theatre companies in Sweden
18th century in Stockholm
Sweden during the Age of Liberty